Zhao Chongyang (born June 17, 1997) is a Chinese kickboxer, currently signed with Wu Lin Feng. He is the former Enfusion -60 kg champion, the 2018 Wu Lin Feng World and 2018 Wu Lin Feng China -60 Tournament Runner-up.

Chongyang was ranked as a top ten flyweight kickboxer by Combat Press between September 2019 and July 2020, as well as a top ten bantamweight kickboxer between February 2021 and April 2022.

Kickboxing career
Zhao participated in the Kunlun Fight 74 8 man tournament. He won the first fight against Saeksan Or. Kwanmuang, but was forced to withdraw from the tournament due to injury.

Chongyang faced Leona Pettas at Krush 90 on July 22, 2018. He lost the fight by a second round knockout.

Zhao fought during Wu Lin Feng: Australia vs China event, with his opponent being Mark Mullan. Zhao won the fight by a third-round KO.

Chongyang faced Pietro Doorje for the vacant Enfusion -60 kg championship at Wu Lin Feng 2019: WLF -67kg World Cup 2019-2020 3rd Group Stage on August 31, 2019. He won the fight by a first-round knockout.

Following a brief pause in kickboxing events during the COVID-19 pandemic, Chongyang fought at Wu Lin Feng 2020: King's Super Cup 1st Group Stage on May 15, 2020, against Fang Feida. He lost the fight by a first-round knockout . 

Chongyang faced Jin Ying at Wu Lin Feng King's Super Cup 2nd Group Stage on June 13, 2020. He lost the fight  by a first-round technical knockout, due to repeated left hooks.

Chongyang faced Yang Hua at Wu Lin Feng 2021: WLF on Haihua Island on October 30, 2021. He won the fight by a second-round technical knockout.

Chongyang faced Ali Zanrifar at Wu Lin Feng 2023: Chinese New Year on February 4, 2023.

Titles and accomplishments
Wu Lin Feng
2018 Wu Lin Feng World −60 kg Tournament Runner-up
2020 Wu Lin Feng China −60 kg Tournament  Runner-up
Enfusion
2019 Enfusion −60 kg Championship

Kickboxing record

|-  style="background:#cfc;"
| 2023-03-18 || Win ||align=left| Piyanan || Wu Lin Feng 535: China vs Netherlands || Tangshan, China || Decision || 3 ||3:00 
|-  style="background:#fbb;"
| 2023-02-04 || Loss|| align=left| Ali Zanrifar || Wu Lin Feng 2023: Chinese New Year || Tangshan, China || Decision ||3  ||3:00 
|-  style="background:#cfc;"
| 2022-09-24 || Win || align=left| Zewa Liluo ||  Wu Lin Feng 531|| Zhengzhou, China || Decision || 3 ||3:00

|-  style="background:#fbb;"
| 2022-03-26 || Loss || align=left| Huang Shuailu || Wu Lin Feng 528, 60kg 4-man Tournament Semi Final || Zhengzhou, China || Decision (Split) || 3 || 3:00

|-  style="background:#cfc;"
| 2022-01-01 ||Win|| align=left| Peimangkhon || Wu Lin Feng 2022 || Tangshan, China || KO (Right Cross) || 3 ||2:10

|-  style="background:#cfc;"
| 2021-10-30 || Win || align=left| Yang Hua || Wu Lin Feng 2021: WLF on Haihua Island || Daizhou, China || TKO (Left High Kick)  ||2  ||

|-  style="background:#fbb;"
| 2021-05-29 || Loss|| align=left| Zhang Lanpei || Wu Lin Feng 2021: World Contender League 4th Stage || Zhengzhou, China || TKO (Punches)  || 2 || 2:02
|-  style="background:#cfc;"
| 2021-03-27 || Win || align=left| Yang Hua || Wu Lin Feng 2021: World Contender League 1st Stage || China || Decision (Unanimous)||3 ||3:00
|-  style="background:#cfc;"
| 2021-01-23 ||Win || align=left| Zhang Lanpei || Wu Lin Feng 2021: Global Kung Fu Festival || Macao, China || Decision ||3 || 3:00
|-  style="background:#fbb;"
| 2020-11-14|| Loss||align=left| Zhang Lanpei || Wu Lin Feng 2020: China 60kg Championship Tournament, Final  || Zhengzhou, China || KO (Punches & Knee)|| 1 || 2:05 
|-
! style=background:white colspan=9 |
|-  style="background:#cfc;"
| 2020-11-14|| Win||align=left| Wang Junyu || Wu Lin Feng 2020: China 60kg Championship Tournament, Semi Final  || Zhengzhou, China || Decision (Unanimous)|| 3 || 3:00
|-  style="background:#cfc;"
| 2020-11-14|| Win||align=left| Li Yuankun || Wu Lin Feng 2020: China 60kg Championship Tournament, Quarter Final  || Zhengzhou, China ||KO (High Knee)|| 1 || 0:40
|-  style="background:#fbb;"
| 2020-06-13 || Loss || align=left| Jin Ying ||Wu Lin Feng 2020: King's Super Cup 2nd Group Stage || Zhengzhou, China || TKO (Left Hook) || 1 || 1:48   
|-
|-  style="background:#fbb;"
| 2020-05-15 || Loss||align=left| Fang Feida || Wu Lin Feng 2020: King's Super Cup 1st Group Stage || Zhengzhou, China || TKO (2 Knockdowns/Punches) || 1 || 2:55
|-  style="background:#cfc;"
| 2020-01-11|| Win||align=left| Frederico Cordeiro || Wu Lin Feng 2020: WLF World Cup 2019-2020 Final  || Zhuhai, China ||Decision (Unanimous)|| 3 || 3:00
|-  style="background:#CCFFCC;"
| 2019-11-30|| Win ||align=left| Chaophraya Petch Por.Tor.Aor || WLF -67kg World Cup 2019-2020 6th Group Stage|| Zhengzhou, China || KO (Punches)|| 1 ||
|-  style="background:#CCFFCC;"
| 2019-10-23|| Win ||align=left| Yannis Osmani || Wu Lin Feng 2019: WLF in Manila  || Manila, Philippines || KO (Punches) || 1 ||
|-  style="background:#FFBBBB;"
| 2019-09-28|| Loss||align=left| Phitthaya || WLF -67kg World Cup 2019-2020 4th Group Stage -60 kg Contender Tournament Semi Final || Zhengzhou, China || Decision || 3 || 3:00   
|-
! style=background:white colspan=9 |
|-  style="background:#CCFFCC;"
| 2019-08-31|| Win ||align=left| Pietro Doorje || Wu Lin Feng 2019: WLF -67kg World Cup 2019-2020 3rd Group Stage || Zhengzhou, China || KO || 1 ||   
|-
! style=background:white colspan=9 |
|-  style="background:#CCFFCC;"
| 2019-07-21|| Win ||align=left| Kento Ito || Wu Lin Feng 2019: WLF x Krush 103 - China vs Japan  || Tokyo, Japan || KO (Flying Knee)|| 3 || 0:16
|-  style="background:#CCFFCC;"
| 2019-04-27|| Win ||align=left| Steve Varela || Wu Lin Feng 2019: WLF -63kg Championship World Tournament  || Zhuhai, China || KO (Jumping knee)|| 1 || 2:01
|-  style="background:#FFBBBB;"
| 2019-03-24|| Loss ||align=left| Aggelos Giakoumis || Wu Lin Feng 2019: WLF x Gods of War XII - China vs Greece  || Athens, Greece || Decision|| 3 || 3:00
|-  style="background:#CCFFCC;"
| 2019-01-19|| Win ||align=left| Jorge Varela || Wu Lin Feng 2019: WLF World Cup 2018-2019 Final || Haikou, China || Decision || 3 || 3:00
|-  style="background:#CCFFCC;"
| 2018-12-01|| Win ||align=left| KJ Hiroshi || WLF -67kg World Cup 2018-2019 6th Round, -60 kg Contender Tournament Reserve fight  || Zhengzhou, China || KO (Corner Stoppage) || 1 || 2:55
|-  style="background:#CCFFCC;"
| 2018-11-04|| Win ||align=left| Mark Mullan || Wu Lin Feng: Australia vs China || Melbourne, Australia || KO (Left Hook) || 3 || 1:20
|-  style="background:#CCFFCC;"
| 2018-09-29|| Win ||align=left| Shoki Kaneda || World Boxing Championship || China || TKO || 3 || 2:05
|-  style="background:#FFBBBB;"
| 2018-07-22|| Loss||align=left| Leona Pettas || Krush.90 || Tokyo, Japan || KO (Punches) || 2 || 2:49
|-  style="background:#CCFFCC;"
| 2018-05-13 || Win ||align=left| Saeksan Or. Kwanmuang || Kunlun Fight 74 – 61.5kg 8 Man Tournament, Quarter Finals || Jinan, China|| Decision (Majority) || 3 || 3:00
|-
! style=background:white colspan=9 |
|-  style="background:#FFBBBB;"
| 2018-03-10|| Loss||align=left| Hirotaka Asahisa || Wu Lin Feng 2018: -60kg World Championship Tournament, Final || Jiaozuo, China || KO (Flying knee) || 4 || 
|-
! style=background:white colspan=9 |
|-
|- bgcolor="#CCFFCC"
| 2018-03-10 || Win ||align=left| Javier Hernandez  || Wu Lin Feng 2018: -60kg World Championship Tournament, Semi Finals || Jiaozuo, China || TKO (Forfeit) || 1 ||
|-
|- bgcolor="#CCFFCC"
| 2018-03-10 || Win ||align=left| Janjao Sitsongpeenong || Wu Lin Feng 2018: -60kg World Championship Tournament, Quarter Finals || Jiaozuo, China ||  KO (Punches) || 1 ||
|-  style="background:#cfc;"
| 2018-02-03|| Win||align=left| Arannchai Kiatpatarapran || Wu Lin Feng 2018: World Championship in Shenzhen || Shenzhen, China || Decision || 3 || 3:00
|-  style="background:#cfc;"
| 2017-11-18|| Win ||align=left| Joe Gogo || Wu Lin Feng 2017: USA vs China || Las Vegas, United States || Decision (Majority) || 3 || 3:00
|-  style="background:#FFBBBB;"
| 2017-09-02|| Loss ||align=left| Hirotaka Asahisa || Wu Lin Feng 2017: World Championship Xi'an || Xi'an, China || Decision (Unanimous)|| 3 || 3:00
|-  style="background:#cfc;"
| 2017-07-01|| Win ||align=left| Andres Unzue || Wu Lin Feng 2017: China VS Spain || Zhengzhou, China || KO (Right Hook) || 1 ||
|-  style="background:#CCFFCC;"
| 2017-04-08 || Win ||align=left| Ilias Ennahachi || Wu Lin Feng || Henan, China || KO (Straight Right) || 1 || 0:32
|-  style="background:#FFBBBB;"
| 2017-03-04|| Loss ||align=left| Hirotaka Asahisa || Wu Lin Feng 2017: 60 kg World Tournament, 1/8 FInals || Zhengzhou, China || Decision (Unanimous)|| 3 || 3:00
|-  style="background:#cfc;"
| 2017-02-10|| Win ||align=left| Singyai Sorporpor || Wu Lin Feng 2017: Battle of the Golden Triangle || Bokeo Province, Laos ||Decision || 3 || 3:00
|-  style="background:#cfc;"
| 2016-09-10|| Win ||align=left| Dzianis Klimovich || Wu Lin Feng 2016: World Kickboxing Championship in Shenzhen  ||  Shenzhen, China ||Decision || 3 || 3:00
|-  style="background:#cfc;"
| ? || Win ||align=left| Ncedo Gomba || Wu Lin Feng 2017 || China || Decision || 3 || 3:00 
|-
| colspan=9 | Legend:

See also
 List of male kickboxers

References 

Chinese male kickboxers
1997 births
Living people
Kunlun Fight kickboxers
Flyweight kickboxers
Sportspeople from Henan